The statue Dream of Saint Lutgardis is an outdoor sculpture by Matthias Braun, installed on the south side of the Charles Bridge in Prague, Czech Republic.

External links

 
 Sculptural group of St. Lutgardis on Charles Bridge / Sousoší Sv. Luitgardy na Karlove moste (Prague) at Waymarking

Christian sculptures
Monuments and memorials in Prague
Sculptures of men in Prague
Sculptures of women in Prague
Statues of Jesus
Statues on the Charles Bridge